Making Gay History is an oral history podcast on the subject of LGBT history, featuring trailblazers, activists, and allies. Most episodes draw on the three-decade-old audio archive of rare interviews that the podcast's founder and host Eric Marcus conducted for the two editions of his oral history book about the LGBT movement, which he was commissioned to write in the late 1980s. In February 2020, Making Gay History was adapted for the stage at New York University's Steinhardt School of Culture, Education, and Human Development.

Background 
The first edition of the book, published in 1992 under the title Making History was a Stonewall Book Award winner in 1992 and was described by acclaimed oral historian Studs Terkel as "[o]ne of the definitive works on gay life."

In the late 1990s, Marcus undertook another round of interviews for the updated second edition of the book, entitled Making Gay History (2002).

In 2016, Marcus revisited the archive of his original recordings, which had since been digitized by the New York Public Library, along with executive producer Sara Burningham, who suggested that the interviews be used as the basis for a podcast.

Since its launch in October 2016, the podcast has featured interviews with transgender rights icon Sylvia Rivera; pioneering lesbian writer Edythe D. Eyde aka Lisa Ben; American comedian, talk show host, and actress Ellen DeGeneres; popular advice columnist and LGBT advocate Pauline Phillips ("Dear Abby"); and others. It has also drawn on other audio archives to highlight the contributions of activists like Ernestine Eckstein and Bayard Rustin, and has used contemporary interviews to chronicle the life and work of Magnus Hirschfeld and Reed Erickson. In December 2019, they released the earliest known recording of Sylvia Rivera and Marsha P. Johnson.

For the eighth season of the podcast, Marcus partnered with the Studs Terkel Radio Archive to release interviews conducted by the legendary radio host and oral historian, Studs Terkel. Marcus cites Terkel and his work as inspiration for his own.

Awards and honors

In September 2017, NBC Out polled its constituents about their "favorite LGBTQ-inclusive podcasts," and Making Gay History was voted #2 out of 11 ranked.
In October 2017, the Oral History Association honored Making Gay History with its Oral History in a Nonprint Format Award.
On December 27, 2019, The Atlantic named Making Gay History's Stonewall 50 season one of the best podcasts of 2019.

Seasons and episodes

See also 
 List of LGBT podcasts

References

External links

Historiography of LGBT in the United States
LGBT-related podcasts
Audio podcasts
LGBT-related mass media in the United States
2016 podcast debuts